Leucanopsis moeschleri is a moth of the subfamily Arctiinae first described by Walter Rothschild in 1909. It is found on Jamaica. It is a very rare immigrant or accidental import in Great Britain. There is one record of an individual taken near Cheltenham, Gloucestershire, on 19 July 1961.

The wingspan is 48–55 mm.

The larvae feed on various broad-leaved trees.
The name honours Heinrich Benno Möschler.

References

Moths described in 1909
moeschleri